Nimdih  is a village in the Nimdih CD block in the Chandil subdivision of the Seraikela Kharsawan district in the Indian state of Jharkhand.

Geography

Location

Area overview
The area shown in the map has been described as “part of the southern fringe of the Chotanagpur plateau and is a hilly upland tract”. 75.7% of the population lives in the rural areas and 24.3% lives in the urban areas.

Note: The map alongside presents some of the notable locations in the district. All places marked in the map are linked in the larger full screen map.

Civic administration
There is a police station at Nimdih. 
 
The headquarters of Nimdih CD block are located at Nimdih village.

Demographics
According to the 2011 Census of India, Nimdih had a total population of 1,349, of which 708 (52%) were males and 641 (48%) were females. Population in the age range 0–6 years was 158. The total number of literate persons in Nimdih was 928 (77.92% of the population over 6 years).

(*For language details see Nimdih block#Language and religion)

Transport
There is a station at Nimdih on the Asansol-Tatanagar-Kharagpur line.

Education
Nimdih Middle School is a Hindi-medium coeducational institution established in 1953. It has facilities for teaching from class I to class VIII.

Bamni High School at Ketunga is a Hindi-medium coeducational institution established in 1952. It has facilities for teaching in classes IX and X. The school has a playground and a library with 200 books.

References

Villages in Seraikela Kharsawan district